Kostyukovka is a rural locality (a selo) in Sagunovskoye Rural Settlement, Podgorensky District, Voronezh Oblast, Russia. The population was 197 as of 2010. There are 4 streets.

Geography 
Kostyukovka is located 24 km north of Podgorensky (the district's administrative centre) by road. Bolshaya Khvoshchevatka is the nearest rural locality.

References 

Rural localities in Podgorensky District